Mahdieh  Mahdieh one of Shia holy sites out there on the field Mahdaviat and remember Muhammad al-Mahdi held a ceremony and speech. Tehran Mahdieh of the proposal is the most famous Ahmad Kafi was developed and widely welcomed by people of his lectures and rituals Du'a Kumayl and Du'a Nudba was located.
The base commemorating the Muhammad al-Mahdi, Jamkaran mosque, at 6 km from the religious city of Qom. According to Shia, The mosque more than a thousand years ago at the behest of Muhammad al-Mahdi was established.

See also
 Hussainiya
 Sayyidah Zaynab Mosque
 Jamkaran

References 

Shia Muslims